In mathematics, the Arf invariant of a nonsingular quadratic form over a field of characteristic 2 was defined by Turkish mathematician  when he started the systematic study of quadratic forms over arbitrary fields of characteristic 2. The Arf invariant is the substitute, in characteristic 2, for the discriminant for quadratic forms in characteristic not 2. Arf used his invariant, among others, in his endeavor to classify quadratic forms in characteristic 2.

In the special case of the 2-element field F2 the Arf invariant can be described as the element of F2 that occurs most often among the values of the form. Two nonsingular quadratic forms over F2 are isomorphic if and only if they have the same dimension and the same Arf invariant.

The Arf invariant is particularly applied in geometric topology, where it is primarily used to define an invariant of -dimensional manifolds (singly even-dimensional manifolds: surfaces (2-manifolds), 6-manifolds, 10-manifolds, etc.) with certain additional structure called a framing, and thus the Arf–Kervaire invariant and the Arf invariant of a knot. The Arf invariant is analogous to the signature of a manifold, which is defined for 4k-dimensional manifolds (doubly even-dimensional); this 4-fold periodicity corresponds to the 4-fold periodicity of L-theory. The Arf invariant can also be defined more generally for certain 2k-dimensional manifolds.

Definitions

The Arf invariant is defined for a quadratic form q over a field K of characteristic 2 such that q is nonsingular, in the sense that the associated bilinear form  is nondegenerate. The form  is alternating since K has characteristic 2; it follows that a nonsingular quadratic form in characteristic 2 must have even dimension.

Every nonsingular quadratic form  over K is equivalent to a direct sum  of nonsingular binary forms. This was shown by Arf, but it had been earlier observed by Dickson in the case of finite fields of characteristic 2.

The Arf invariant is additive; in other words, the Arf invariant of an orthogonal sum of two quadratic forms is the sum of their Arf invariants.

For a field K of characteristic 2, Artin–Schreier theory identifies the quotient group of K by the subgroup U above with the Galois cohomology group H1(K, F2). In other words, the nonzero elements of K/U are in one-to-one correspondence with the separable quadratic extension fields of K. So the Arf invariant of a nonsingular quadratic form over K is either zero or it describes a separable quadratic extension field of K. This is analogous to the discriminant of a nonsingular quadratic form over a field F of characteristic not 2. In that case, the discriminant takes values in F*/(F*)2, which can be identified with H1(F, F2) by Kummer theory.

Arf's main results

If the field K is perfect, then every nonsingular quadratic form over K is uniquely determined (up to equivalence) by its dimension and its Arf invariant. In particular, this holds over the field F2. In this case, the subgroup U above is zero, and hence the Arf invariant is an element of the base field F2; it is either 0 or 1.

If the field K of characteristic 2 is not perfect (that is, K is different from its subfield K2 of squares), then the Clifford algebra is another important invariant of a quadratic form. A corrected version of Arf's original statement is that if the degree [K: K2] is at most 2, then every quadratic form over K is completely characterized by its dimension, its Arf invariant and its Clifford algebra. Examples of such fields are function fields (or power series fields) of one variable over perfect base fields.

Quadratic forms over F2

William Browder has called the Arf invariant the democratic invariant because it is the value which is assumed most often by the quadratic form. Another characterization: q has Arf invariant 0 if and only if the underlying 2k-dimensional vector space over the field F2 has a k-dimensional subspace on which q is identically 0 – that is, a totally isotropic subspace of half the dimension. In other words, a nonsingular quadratic form of dimension 2k has Arf invariant 0 if and only if its isotropy index is k (this is the maximum dimension of a totally isotropic subspace of a nonsingular form).

The Arf invariant in topology

Let M be a compact, connected 2k-dimensional manifold with a boundary 
such that the induced morphisms in -coefficient homology

are both zero (e.g. if  is closed). The intersection form 

is non-singular.

Then there are two possibilities. Call the first case , and the second case . Since every form is equivalent to a symplectic form, we can always find subspaces  with x and y being -dual. Furthermore, by a clever change of basis,  We therefore define the Arf invariant

Examples

 Let  be a compact, connected, oriented 2-dimensional manifold, i.e. a surface, of genus  such that the boundary  is either empty or is connected. Choose a framing of M, that is a trivialization of the normal (m − 2)-plane vector bundle. Each basis element is represented by an embedded circle . The isomorphism here is via the Pontrjagin-Thom construction. Define  to be this element. The Arf invariant of the framed surface is now defined

The case  is also admissible as long as we take the residue modulo 2 of the framing.

 The Arf invariant  of a framed surface detects whether there is a 3-manifold whose boundary is the given surface which extends the given framing. An odd number of twists, known as the Lie group framing, does not extend across a disc, whilst an even number of twists does. (Note that this corresponds to putting a spin structure on our surface.) Pontrjagin used the Arf invariant of framed surfaces to compute the 2-dimensional framed cobordism group , which is generated by the torus  with the Lie group framing. The isomorphism here is via the Pontrjagin-Thom construction.

 Let  be a Seifert surface for a knot, which can be represented as a disc  with bands attached. The bands will typically be twisted and knotted. Each band corresponds to a generator .  can be represented by a circle which traverses one of the bands. Define  to be the number of full twists in the band modulo 2. Around any generator , we now have a trivial normal 3-plane vector bundle. Trivialise it using the trivial framing of the normal bundle to the embedding  for 2 of the sections required.

 The Arf invariant of a knot is defined via its Seifert surface. It is independent of the choice of Seifert surface (The basic surgery change of S-equivalence, adding/removing a tube, adds/deletes a  direct summand), and so is a knot invariant. It is additive under connected sum, and vanishes on slice knots, so is a knot concordance invariant.

 The intersection form on the -dimensional -coefficient homology  of a framed -dimensional manifold M has a quadratic refinement , which depends on the framing. The Kervaire invariant is a homomorphism  on the -dimensional stable homotopy group of spheres. The Kervaire invariant can also be defined for a -dimensional manifold M which is framed except at a point.

 In surgery theory, for any -dimensional normal map  there is defined a nonsingular quadratic form  on the -coefficient homology kernel

 

refining the homological intersection form . The Arf invariant of this form is the Kervaire invariant of (f,b). In the special case  this is the Kervaire invariant of M. The Kervaire invariant features in the classification of exotic spheres by Michel Kervaire and John Milnor, and more generally in the classification of manifolds by surgery theory. William Browder defined  using functional Steenrod squares, and C. T. C. Wall defined  using framed immersions. The quadratic enhancement  crucially provides more information than  : it is possible to kill x by surgery if and only if .

See also
 de Rham invariant, a mod 2 invariant of -dimensional manifolds

Notes

References
 See Lickorish (1997) for the relation between the Arf invariant and the Jones polynomial.
 See Chapter 3 of Carter's book for another equivalent definition of the Arf invariant in terms of self-intersections of discs in 4-dimensional space.

Glen Bredon: Topology and Geometry, 1993, .

 J. Scott Carter: How Surfaces Intersect in Space, Series on Knots and Everything, 1993, .

 

 W. B. Raymond Lickorish, An Introduction to Knot Theory, Graduate Texts in Mathematics, Springer, 1997, 
 
 Lev Pontryagin, Smooth manifolds and their applications in homotopy theory American Mathematical Society Translations, Ser. 2, Vol. 11, pp. 1–114 (1959)

Further reading
 
 

Quadratic forms
Surgery theory